Yu Chaohong (born November 3, 1975 in Yunnan) is a Chinese race walker.

Achievements

References

1975 births
Living people
Athletes (track and field) at the 2004 Summer Olympics
Chinese male racewalkers
Olympic athletes of China
Athletes from Yunnan
Asian Games medalists in athletics (track and field)
Athletes (track and field) at the 2002 Asian Games
Asian Games silver medalists for China
Medalists at the 2002 Asian Games